Souls in Pawn may refer to:
 Souls in Pawn (1917 film), an American silent spy-drama film
 Souls in Pawn (1940 film), an American drama film